Allen R. Dyer is professor of psychiatry and behavioral sciences with the George Washington University. He is a distinguished life fellow of the American Psychiatric Association.
 As of January 2017 he is the sole surviving member of the committee that formulated the Goldwater rule of the American Psychiatric Association.

Education
Dyer is a graduate of Brown University and did his MD and PhD (religion/biomedical ethics) at Duke University.

Selected publications
 Ethics and Psychiatry: Toward Professional Definition. American Psychiatric Press, Washington, D.C., 1988.
 One More Mountain to Climb: What My Illness Taught me about Health

References

External links
 https://www.researchgate.net/profile/Allen_Dyer

American psychiatrists
George Washington University faculty
Living people
Year of birth missing (living people)
Duke University School of Medicine alumni
Brown University alumni